C. Edward Vosbury was an architect in Binghamton, New York, noted for his design of mansions.

Vosbury was a native of Windsor, in Broome County, New York.  He studied in New York City, Boston, and Paris.  He "established a reputation for designing elegant and well-organized residences for wealthy Binghamtonians.  Vosbury was the architect of many of the large houses in the Front Street-Riverside Drive area, Binghamton's most prestigious Edwardian neighborhood."

His works include:
McKinnon House, Utica, 1899 (listed on the National Register of Historic Places)
Roberson Mansion, 30 Front Street, Binghamton, 1904 (also an NRHP, said to be very similar to the McKinnon House)

References

American architects
Year of death missing
Year of birth missing
People from Windsor, New York
People from Binghamton, New York
Architects from New York (state)